One Man's War is a 1991 television drama film set in Paraguay in 1976, under the dictatorship of General Alfredo Stroessner. It is based on the true story of Joel Filártiga (played by Anthony Hopkins), who sought justice for his son's death at the hands of Stroessner's secret police. The film stops before Filártiga launches the landmark international law case of Filártiga v. Peña-Irala (1980).

References

External links
 

1991 films
1991 drama films
HBO Films films
Films about Latin American military dictatorships
American films based on actual events
Films directed by Sérgio Toledo
Films set in Paraguay
1990s English-language films